Clyde R. Kersey (born 4 November 1937) is a Democratic member of the Indiana House of Representatives, representing the 43rd District since 1996. He is also a former member of the Vigo County Council from 1999 to 2004. In 2017, Kersey announced that he would not run for reelection to the State House.

References

External links
Indiana State Legislature - Representative Clyde Kersey Official government website
Project Vote Smart - Representative Clyde R. Kersey (IN) profile
Follow the Money - Clyde Kersey
2008 2006 2004 2002 2000 1998 1996 campaign contributions

Democratic Party members of the Indiana House of Representatives
1937 births
Living people
Politicians from Terre Haute, Indiana
21st-century American politicians